The following outline is provided as an overview of and topical guide to German language:

One of the major languages of the world, German is the first language of almost 100 million people worldwide and the most widely spoken native language in the European Union. Together with French, German is the second most commonly spoken foreign language in the EU after English, making it the second biggest language in the EU in terms of overall speakers.

What type of thing is German language? 

German language can be described as all of the following:

Language family
Indo-European languages
Proto-Germanic language
Germanic languages
West Germanic languages
German language
High German: Standard High German, Central German, Upper German – diachronic: Old High German, Middle High German, New High German
Low German – diachronic: Old Saxon, Middle Low German, New Low German

Dialects of German language 

Aachen dialect
Alsatian dialect
Alzenau dialect
Amana German
Argentinien-schwyzertütsch dialect
Austrian German
Barossa German
Basel German
Bavarian language
Bergish dialects
Berlin German
Bernese German
Bernese German phonology
Bönnsch dialect
Brandenburgisch dialect
Brazilian German
Central Bavarian
Central German
Central Thuringian
Chemnitz dialect 
Cimbrian language 
Colonia Tovar dialect
Duisburg dialect  
East Central German
East Franconian German
East Frisian Low Saxon  
East Low German
East Pomeranian dialect 
Eastphalian dialect
Erzgebirgisch
Franconian languages 
Friso-Saxon dialects  
Gottscheerish
Hamburg German
High Alemannic German
High German languages 
High Prussian dialect
Highest Alemannic German
Historic Colognian
Hohenlohisch dialect 
Hunsrückisch dialect
Hutterite German
Itzgründisch dialect
Kerkrade dialect  
Colognian dialect  
Koschneiderisch
Lachoudisch
Lorraine Franconian
Lotegorisch
Low Alemannic German
Low Dietsch dialects 
Low Lusatian German
Low Prussian dialect
Lusatian dialects
Luxembourgish
Mecklenburgisch-Vorpommersch dialect
Meuse-Rhenish
Missingsch
Mòcheno language
Moselle Franconian dialects
Multiethnolect
Mundart des Kürzungsgebiets
Mundart des Ostgebietes 
Mundart des Weichselmündungsgebietes
Nehrungisch
Nordostniederdeutsch 
North Upper Saxon
Northern Bavarian
Northern Low Saxon
Ostkäslausch 
Palatine German language
Paraná-Wolga-Deutsch 
Pennsylvania German language
Plautdietsch language
Rhine Franconian dialects
Ripuarian language
Ruhrdeutsch
Sathmar Swabian
Siegerländisch
Silesian German
South Bergish
South Franconian German 
South Guelderish
South Tyrolean dialect
Southern Bavarian
Standard German
Swabian German
Swiss German
Texas German
Thuringian dialect
Transylvanian Saxon dialect
Upper German
Upper Saxon German
Viennese German
Vogtlandian
Vorerzgebirgisch
Walser German
Werdersch
West Central German
West Low German
Westphalian language
Wisconsin German
Wymysorys language 
Yenish language  
Yiddish dialects
Yiddish
Zipser German
Zürich German

Distribution of German language 
List of territorial entities where German is an official language
Geographical distribution of German speakers

History of German language 

History of German
Old High German
Middle High German
New High German
Early New High German
Standard German
Duden
German Orthographic Conference of 1901
German orthography reform of 1996
Old Saxon
Middle Low German
Low German

General German language concepts 

German grammar
Accusative absolute
Adverbial genitive
German articles
Der Dativ ist dem Genitiv sein Tod
German adjectives
German adverbial phrases 
German compounds
German conjugation
German modal particles 
German sentence structure 
Germanic strong verb
Germanic verb
Germanic weak verb
Grammatical gender in German
Hammer's German Grammar and Usage
German nouns 
German pronouns
German verbs 
German declension

German phonology 
Bernese German phonology  
Bühnendeutsch
Standard German phonology
Pronunciation of v in German
Rheinische Dokumenta 
Teuthonista

German orthography
Council for German Orthography 
Fraktur
German Orthographic Conference of 1901
German orthography reform of 1944
German orthography reform of 1996

German language dictionaries 

List of German dictionaries 
Altägyptisches Wörterbuch
Cooperative Dictionary of the Rhinelandic Colloquial Language
Petrus Dasypodius
Deutsches Fremdwörterbuch
Deutsches Rechtswörterbuch
Deutsches Wörterbuch
Dictionarium quatuor linguarum
Duden
Etymological Dictionary of the German Language
Johannes Fries
German–Serbian dictionary (1791)
Der Große Muret Sanders
Historisch-kritisches Wörterbuch des Marxismus
LEO (website)
Linguee
Josua Maaler
Österreichisches Wörterbuch
Prosopographisches Lexikon der Palaiologenzeit  
Reverso (language tools)
Schweizerisches Idiotikon
SkELL
Vocabularius ex quo
Wörterbuch der ägyptischen Sprache

German-language encyclopedias 

Abrogans
Agent*In
Alemannic Wikipedia
Allgemeine Deutsche Biographie
The Austro-Hungarian Monarchy in Word and Picture
Brockhaus Enzyklopädie
Deutsches Theater-Lexikon
Encyclopedia of Life
Encyclopedia of Fairy Tales
Glottopedia
Historical Dictionary of Switzerland
Klein's encyclopedia
Klexikon
Munzinger-Archiv
Oesterreichisches Musiklexikon
Realencyclopädie der classischen Altertumswissenschaft
Ripuarian Wikipedia
Swiss Biographical Archive
Verfasserlexikon
German Wikipedia

German words and phrases 

Glossary of Nazi Germany
List of German expressions in English
Angstloch
Arbeit macht frei
Arbeitseinsatz
Auslese
Bambule
Bandenbekämpfung
Beerenauslese
Befehlsnotstand
Bergfried
Bildungsbürgertum
Bildungsroman
Blut und Boden
Bundespräsidentenstichwahlwiederholungsverschiebung
Das Dritte Reich (disambiguation)
Desk murderer
Dienstmann
Donaudampfschiffahrtsgesellschaft
Donaudampfschiffahrtselektrizitätenhauptbetriebswerkbauunterbeamtengesellschaft
Doppelgänger
Drang nach Osten
Drittes Reich
Eidgenossenschaft
Eissporthalle
Endsieg
Fach
Fahlband
Fahrvergnügen
Festschrift
Festung
Feuerschutzpolizei
Fingerspitzengefühl
Fräulein
Freischar
Freiwilliger Arbeitsdienst (FAD)
Freiwilliger Helfer der Volkspolizei
Führer
Führerprinzip
Fürst
Gänsebraten
Gastarbeiter
Gau (territory)
Gauliga
Gebrauchsmusik
Gedankenexperiment
Gegenschein
Geist
Geistesgeschichte
Gemeinde (theology)
Gemeindepolizei
Gemeindeverband
Gemeinschaft and Gesellschaft
Gemütlichkeit
Generalmusikdirektor
Generalplan Ost
Gesamtbedeutung
Gesamtkunstwerk
Gesamtschule
Gewürztraminer
Gleichschaltung
Glockenspiel
Goetheforschung
Goldschläger
Goralenvolk
Gott mit uns
Gott strafe England
Graf
Grammatischer Wechsel
Gruppenführer
Grüß Gott
Gutmensch
Hansaplatz
Hauländer
Hauptmann
Hauptstimme
Hauptvermutung
Heerstraße
Heiligenschein
Heim ins Reich
Heimat
Heimatforscher
Herrenhaus
Himbeergeist
Himmelblau
Hirtenkäse
Historikerstreit
Hochmeister
Hochschule
Hofmeister (office)
Hohlraum
Ich bin ein Berliner
Jäger (infantry)
Jedem das Seine
Josephskreuz
Journaille
Jüdischer Kulturbund
Junker
Kabarettist
Kabinett
Kaiserlich
Imperial and Royal
Kaiserreich
Kaiserthum
Kammersänger
Kampfgruppe
Kanake
Kanalkrankheit
Kanne (surname)
Kapellmeister
Kapitän
Kaserne
Kassirer
Kassler
Katzbalger
Kennkarte
Kesselgarden
Kiez
Kinder, Küche, Kirche
Kirchweger-Kondensationseinrichtung
Kleinstaaterei
Konditorei
Kongokonferenz
Königstrasse
Kriegsspiel (disambiguation)
Kriminalpolizei
Kristallnacht
Kuchen
Kugel
Kulturdenkmal
Kulturgeschichte
Kulturkampf
Kunstgewerbeschule
Kunsthalle
Künstlerroman
Lagerstätte
Länder
Landesrabbiner
Landflucht
Landschaftsverband
Landsknecht
Language speaks
Lebensraum
Leberkäse
Lehrstücke
Leitkultur
Leitwortstil
Lesesucht
Liebfraumilch
List of stoffs
Literaturoper
Loanwords in German
Luft
Luftwaffe
Lügenpresse
Lutherkirche
Magenbrot
Mahlzeit
Maultasche
Meine Ehre heißt Treue
Meistersinger
Mensch
Mensurstrich
Glossary of German military terms
Ministerpräsident
Mitläufer
Mittelafrika
Mitteleuropa
Mittelschmerz
Mittelstand
Moin
Muggeseggele
Multikulti
Musikdrama
Muttiheft
Nacht und Nebel
Nachtigall
Nibelung
Nur für Deutsche
Nuremberg Funnel
Oberbürgermeister
Oberteich
Ohrwurm
One-Mensch-Theater
Opernball
Ordnung muss sein
Ordnungspolizei
Ostalgie
Ostforschung
Ostindustrie
Ostpolitik
Ostsiedlung
Pakfront
Panzer
Panzerkeil
Patzer

People influential in German language

Linguists 
 Johann Christoph Adelung
 George Oliver Curme
 Johann Christoph Gottsched
 Jacob Grimm
 Simon Heinrich Adolf Herling
 Wilhelm Theodor Schiefler
 Justus Georg Schottelius
 Kaspar von Stieler
 Harald Weinrich

German-language schools 

German American School
German School Kuala Lumpur
German School of Connecticut
Deutsche Schule Helsinki
Internationales Kulturinstitut
St. Kilian's German School
Bahçelievler Anatolian High School
Cağaloğlu Anadolu Lisesi
German International School New York
Nikolaus Lenau High School
German School of Oslo
Samuel von Brukenthal National College

See also 
Outline of Esperanto

References

External links 
 A Guide to German - 10 facts about the German language
 Britannica: German-language

German language
German language
German language